Firestar may refer to:

Firestar (Marvel Comics), a comic book superhero originating in the 1980s animated series Spider-Man and His Amazing Friends
Firestar (novel), a novel by Michael Flynn
Fire Star (novel), a novel by Chris D'Lacey
Firestar (limited series), a comic book limited series
Firestar (Warriors character), the main protagonist from the book series Warriors
Firestar (Dungeons & Dragons), a monster from the 2nd edition of the Dungeons & Dragons role-playing game
Star Firestar M43, a firearm manufactured by Star Bonifacio Echeverria, S.A. in Eibar, Spain
Kolb Firestar, an ultralight aircraft

See also
 Firestar's Quest
 Starfire (disambiguation)